Mattia Aramu (born 14 May 1995) is an Italian professional footballer who plays as an attacking midfielder for  club Genoa, on loan from Venezia.

Early life
Aramu was born to a father from Turin and a mother from Como, and his paternal grandfather was of Sardinian origin.

Club career

Early career
Aramu began his career with amateur club A.S.D. Real Leini. At only eight years old he was noticed by former Torino players Antonio Comi and Silvano Benedetti and joined the Torino youth. In 2013–14 he was one of the stars of the Primavera side of Moreno Longo that reached the finals of the tournament, lost on penalties to Chievo Verona. He finished the season with 20 goals scored between the league and cup (with two fundamental goals scored in the final phase of the tournament against Lazio). Throughout the season he was regularly called up to the first team by coach Giampiero Ventura.

Loan to Trapani
In the 2014–15 season Aramu joined Trapani on loan. He made his debut on 30 August 2014 against Pescara in a Serie B game. He replaced Giovanni Abate after 53 minutes. He scored his first goal in Serie B on 1 November 2014, deciding the match against Brescia, 3–2.

Loan to Livorno
On 5 August 2015, Aramu was loaned to Livorno. He scored his first goal for Livorno against Ternana, then scored two braces against Ascoli and Lanciano at the end of the season that were not enough for Livorno to avoid relegation to Lega Pro.

Torino
Aramu made his official debut for Torino on 14 August 2016 in the third round of Coppa Italia against Pro Vercelli, entering as a substitute for Adem Ljajic in the 87th minute.

Venezia
On 10 July 2019, Aramu signed a three-year contract with Venezia.

Genoa
On 25 August 2022, Venezia reached agreement with Genoa under which Aramu moved to Genoa on loan with a subsequent obligation to buy, and Antonio Candela and cash moved in the opposite direction.

International career

On 5 August 2015 he was called up to Italy under-21 team by Luigi Di Biagio for the first friendly of the new biennium to be played on 12 August in Telki against Hungary.

Career statistics

Club

References

External links
 
 

1995 births
People from Cirié
Footballers from Piedmont
Living people
Italian footballers
Association football midfielders
Italy under-21 international footballers
Italy youth international footballers
Serie A players
Serie B players
Serie C players
Trapani Calcio players
U.S. Livorno 1915 players
Torino F.C. players
Virtus Entella players
A.C.N. Siena 1904 players
Venezia F.C. players
Genoa C.F.C. players
Sportspeople from the Metropolitan City of Turin